Dooralong is a suburb of the Central Coast region of New South Wales, Australia. It is part of the  local government area. Dooralong had a population of 362 at the 2016 census.

References

Suburbs of the Central Coast (New South Wales)